Ann Curthoys,  (born 5 September 1945) is an Australian historian and academic.

Early life and education

Curthoys was born in Sydney, New South Wales, on 5 September 1945, and completed her undergraduate degree at the University of Sydney. In 1965, she took part in the Freedom Ride which highlighted racism against Aboriginal Australians in several towns. She completed a PhD at Macquarie University in 1973 and subsequently worked as a tutor and research assistant.

Academic career
In 1976, Curthoys established the Women's Studies Program at the Australian National University (ANU) after becoming active in the women's movement in 1970. She taught at the University of Technology, Sydney from 1978 to 1995, when she returned to the ANU to take up the Chair of History. Curthoys was the Group of Eight Visiting Professor of Australian Studies at Georgetown University in 2003 and 2004. In addition to her teaching work, Curthoys has extensively published on Australian history and historiography.

Curthoys retired in 2013, but remains active as a researcher, writer and supervisor of graduate students at the University of Sydney.

Recognition
In 1997, Curthoys was elected to the Academy of Social Sciences in Australia. She was also elected to the Australian Academy of the Humanities in 2003. In 2013 she was awarded the Annual History Citation by the History Council of NSW for "her outstanding contributions as an historian to teaching, scholarship and the community".

In 2019 the Australian Historical Association inaugurated the Ann Curthoys Prize, to be awarded for the best unpublished article-length work by an early career researcher.

In 2019 Curthoys was shortlisted for the NSW Premier's History Awards for Taking Liberty: Indigenous Rights and Settler Self-Government in Colonial Australia, 1830–1890, co-authored with Jessie Mitchell.

Curthoys was appointed a Member of the Order of Australia in the 2021 Queen's Birthday Honours for "significant service to tertiary education, to social history, and to research".

Works

References

1945 births
Australian historians
Academic staff of the Australian National University
Members of the Order of Australia
Fellows of the Academy of the Social Sciences in Australia
Fellows of the Australian Academy of the Humanities
Living people
Macquarie University alumni
People from Sydney
University of Sydney alumni
Academic staff of the University of Sydney
Academic staff of the University of Technology Sydney